Pseudoplecta is a monotypic genus of  air-breathing land snails, terrestrial pulmonate gastropod mollusks in the subfamily Trochomorphoidea of the family Dyakiidae. 

Its sole member is the species Pseudoplecta bijuga, which may be endemic to Thailand and Malaysia.

References

 Bank, R. A. (2017). Classification of the Recent terrestrial Gastropoda of the World. Last update: July 16th, 2017.

External links
 Jirapatrasilp, P.; Tongkerd, P.; Jeratthitikul, E.; Liew, T.-S.; Pholyotha, A.; Sutcharit, C.; Panha, S. (2020). Molecular phylogeny of the limacoid snail family Dyakiidae in Southeast Asia, with the description of a new genus and species. Zoological Journal of the Linnean Society. 193(1): 250-280

Dyakiidae
Gastropods described in 1873
Monotypic gastropod genera